Igor Joksimović (born 16 August 1980) is a Bosnian Serb retired football striker.

Club career
He played in the youth team of Partizan. In 2002 move to home city and signed for FK Leotar where was champion in his first season. Scored one of the most important goals that season for title against Siroki Brijeg in last minute of the game. Good performance in few season in Leotar recommend him in Ukraine football 2005. He had good experience in Asian football where play well for PSIS Semarang in Highest Level Division in Indonesia on 2007.

He signed for KF Shkumbini in January 2009. However, he then quit the club on 20 May 2009 along with Cvete Deliovski, Ahmed Mujdragić, the club president and the club's manager.

References

External links
 Interview and career story in Glas Tb
 
 
 

1980 births
Living people
People from Trebinje
Serbs of Bosnia and Herzegovina
Association football forwards
Bosnia and Herzegovina footballers
FK Partizan players
FK Leotar players
FK Rudar Ugljevik players
PSIS Semarang players
FC Hoverla Uzhhorod players
FK Zemun players
AC Oulu players
FC Ararat Yerevan players
KS Shkumbini Peqin players
FK Sloboda Tuzla players
FK Modriča players
NK Bratstvo Gračanica players
First League of Serbia and Montenegro players
Premier League of Bosnia and Herzegovina players
Ukrainian Premier League players
Ykkönen players
Armenian Premier League players
Kategoria Superiore players
First League of the Federation of Bosnia and Herzegovina players
Bosnia and Herzegovina expatriate footballers
Expatriate footballers in Indonesia
Bosnia and Herzegovina expatriate sportspeople in Indonesia
Expatriate footballers in Ukraine
Bosnia and Herzegovina expatriate sportspeople in Ukraine
Expatriate footballers in Finland
Bosnia and Herzegovina expatriate sportspeople in Finland
Expatriate footballers in Armenia
Bosnia and Herzegovina expatriate sportspeople in Armenia
Expatriate footballers in Albania
Bosnia and Herzegovina expatriate sportspeople in Albania
Expatriate footballers in Spain
Bosnia and Herzegovina expatriate sportspeople in Spain